Algerri is a municipality in the  comarca of Noguera, in the province of Lleida, Catalonia, Spain.

Agriculture is a principal economy activity, dedicated mainly to dryland farming. Cultivation of cereals, olives, almonds  and sheep husbandry are of importance.

References

External links
Official website 
 Government data pages 

Municipalities in Noguera (comarca)
Populated places in Noguera (comarca)